Juan Manuel Pérez-Giménez (March 28, 1941 – December 10, 2020) was a United States district judge of the United States District Court for the District of Puerto Rico.

Education and career

Born in Río Piedras, San Juan, Puerto Rico, Pérez-Giménez received a Bachelor of Arts degree from the University of Puerto Rico in 1963, a Master of Business Administration from George Washington University in 1965, and a Bachelor of Laws from the University of Puerto Rico School of Law in 1968. He was in private practice in San Juan from 1968 to 1971, and was then an Assistant United States Attorney for the District of Puerto Rico from 1971 to 1975. He was a United States magistrate judge for the District of Puerto Rico from 1975 to 1979.

Federal judicial service

On October 23, 1979, Pérez-Giménez was nominated by President Jimmy Carter to a new seat on the United States District Court for the District of Puerto Rico created by 92 Stat. 1629. He was confirmed by the United States Senate on December 5, 1979, and received his commission the following day. He served as Chief Judge from 1984 to 1991, and assumed senior status on March 28, 2006. Pérez-Giménez died on December 10, 2020, at the age of 79. He had just marked his 41st year as a district court judge on December 5, 2020.

Controversial case

On October 21, 2014, Pérez-Giménez upheld Puerto Rico's ban on same-sex marriage, but the 1st Circuit sent the case back to the trial court after the Supreme Court's June 2015 ruling in Obergefell v. Hodges striking down marriage bans nationwide. The appeals court ordered Pérez-Giménez to "further consider" the matter "in light of Obergefell," adding that the appeals court judges "agree with the parties…that the ban is unconstitutional." Nonetheless, in March 2016, Pérez-Giménez upheld the ban for a second time, ruling that the Supreme Court's ruling does not apply to a territory like Puerto Rico. On April 7, 2016, the Court of Appeals overturned Pérez-Giménez' ruling, stating that it "errs in so many respects that it is hard to know where to begin." The case was assigned to a different judge for final disposition.

See also
List of Hispanic/Latino American jurists

References

Sources
 

1941 births
2020 deaths
20th-century American judges
21st-century American judges
Assistant United States Attorneys
George Washington University School of Business alumni
Hispanic and Latino American judges
Judges of the United States District Court for the District of Puerto Rico
People from Río Piedras, Puerto Rico
United States magistrate judges
United States district court judges appointed by Jimmy Carter
University of Puerto Rico alumni